Ted Frechette (born 1941) was a former award-winning defensive back who played with the Edmonton Eskimos in the Canadian Football League from 1962 to 1963.

A graduate of the University of Alberta, Frechette joined the Eskimos in 1962, and on the strength of his one interception and 13 punt returns for 110 yards, won the Dr. Beattie Martin Trophy as top rookie in the west (when only Canadians were eligible for the award.) He played one more season with the Eskimos, returning 2 punts.

References

1941 births
Living people
Canadian Football League Rookie of the Year Award winners
Edmonton Elks players